Manipal Health Enterprises, commonly known as Manipal Hospitals, is a chain of multi-specialty hospitals in India. The hospitals trace their origins to the Kasturba Medical College, founded by T. M. A. Pai in 1953. Manipal Hospitals is the second largest healthcare provider in India, with a network of 28 hospitals. Manipal Hospitals is part of the Manipal Education and Medical Group.

History
In 1953, T. M. A. Pai founded the Kasturba Medical College in coastal Karnataka. The college operated as a public private partnership by using the government hospitals in Mangalore. Dr. Pai was an Indian doctor, educationist and philanthropist and was awarded the Padma Shri by the Government of India in 1972.

The first branch of Manipal Hospitals was started in 1991 in Bangalore. The branch is a 600-bed quaternary care facility and houses over 60 specialties. In 1997, Manipal Hospitals, Mangalore was established, this 251-bed tertiary care hospital is named KMC Hospital, a teaching hospital of the Kasturba Medical College, Mangalore.

In April 2021, Manipal Hospitals announced the sale of its only hospital outside India, Manipal Hospital Klang, Malaysia, to Ramsay Sime Darby Health Care for a reported .

In 2021, Manipal Hospitals completed the acquisition of Columbia Asia's 11 hospitals in India for 2,100 crore. All Columbia Asia hospitals were subsequently rebranded as Manipal Hospitals. In 2021, Manipal Hospitals acquired Vikram Hospital in Bangalore for 350 crore.

In 2022, Manipal Hospitals group company Manipal HealthMap acquired a majority stake in diagnostics company Medcis PathLabs.

See also
 Manipal Academy of Higher Education
 Sikkim Manipal University
 Manipal Foundation

References

Manipal Education and Medical Group
Hospital networks in India
1953 establishments in India
Hospitals established in 1953
Companies based in Bangalore